Thadious M. Davis is the Geraldine R. Segal Professor of American Social Thought and Professor of English at the University of Pennsylvania. She is best known for her work on African American and Southern literature.

Education and career 
Davis has a B.S. from Southern University and an M.A. from Atlanta University. She earned her Ph.D. from Boston University. 

She has been a professor at the University of North Carolina at Chapel Hill, Brown University, and Vanderbilt University, where she held the position of the Gertrude Conway Vanderbilt Professor of English. As of 2022, she is the Geraldine R. Segal Professor of American Social Thought and Professor of English at the University of Pennsylvania. 

Davis has been a fellow at multiple libraries, including the Newberry Library in Chicago, the Cullman Center for Scholars and Writers at the New York Public Library, and the Huntington Library in San Marino, California, where she held the R. Stanton Avery Distinguished Fellowship.

Works 
Davis is known for her writings on race, gender, and region. She wrote a biography of Nella Larsen, Nella Larsen, Novelist of the Harlem Renaissance, and edited the Penguin Classics editions of both of Larsen's books: Passing and Quicksand. Her 2009 book, Games of Property: Law, Race, Gender, and Faulkner's Go Down Moses, received honorable mention for the William Sanders Scarborough Prize Winners given by from the Modern Language Association. Her 2014 book, Southscapes: Geographies of Race, Region, Literature focuses on writings by black southern writers from Mississippi and Louisiana.

Selected publications

Honors and awards 
In 1994 Davis received the Anna Julia Cooper Award for Feminist Scholarship from Spelman College. In 1995 the College Language Association presented Davis with an award for creative scholarship for her book on Nella Larsen. She received a lifetime achievement award from the Society for the Study of Multi-Ethnic Literature in 2007. In 2017, she received the Callaloo’s Lifetime Achievement Award for American Literary and Cultural Studies.

References 

Living people
1944 births
Southern University alumni
Atlanta University alumni
Boston University alumni
University of Pennsylvania faculty
African-American women writers
African-American academics